Lord Browne or Lord Brown may refer to

 Wilfred Brown, Baron Brown (1908–1985), metals company executive
 George Brown, Baron George-Brown (1914–1985), British Labour politician
 Nicholas Browne-Wilkinson, Baron Browne-Wilkinson (born 1930), jurist
 Simon Brown, Baron Brown of Eaton-under-Heywood (born 1937), British jurist
 Wallace Browne, Baron Browne of Belmont (born 1947), Northern Ireland Unionist politician
 John Browne, Baron Browne of Madingley (born 1948), former BP executive
 Des Browne, Baron Browne of Ladyton (born 1952), Scottish Labour politician

See also
 Baron Browne, American musician